"Soul Hunter" is the second episode of the first season of the science fiction television series, Babylon 5. It first aired on 2 February 1994.

Title
The title refers to the Soul Hunter, a member of an ancient alien order which claims they collect and preserve the souls of distinguished people at the moment of death.

Plot
An unknown damaged ship appears through the jump gate and hurtles towards the Babylon 5 station. Commander Sinclair grapples the ship onboard the station with his Starfury fighter, and the ship's occupant is taken to MedLab. In MedLab, upon seeing the patient, the Minbari Ambassador, Delenn, suddenly enters a burst of rage, and tries to shoot the patient. She explains to Sinclair that the patient is a "Shak Tot", a soul hunter, a member of an ancient alien order who try to collect and preserve the souls of distinguished people at the moment of death. The Minbari despise them, considering them thieves and kidnappers, "ripping away that which is eternal". Delenn urges Sinclair to send the Soul Hunter away while he still can.

The alien population aboard the station has gone into hiding, and several ships have asked to leave the station ahead of schedule. The soul hunter explains to Sinclair that his order are not thieves, merely preservers. They had been prevented from "preserving" the soul of the Minbari leader Dukhat at the beginning of the Earth-Minbari War. Sinclair asks the soul hunter to leave as soon as his ship is repaired.

The soul hunter recognizes Delenn from his previous attempt to "preserve" Dukhat's soul for his collection, and identifies Delenn as a "Satai", a member of the nine-member ruling body of the Minbari people, asking he why, as a great leader of the Minbari, she is here playing ambassador.

A second soul hunter arrives on board Babylon 5. He explains to Sinclair that the first soul hunter is a disturbed renegade. Having failed to "preserve" Dukhat's soul, he has become increasingly frustrated and unstable; and he has turned to killing people before their natural death in order to capture their souls.

Meanwhile, the first soul hunter has kidnapped Delenn, and starts to drain her blood. Sinclair locates them, resulting in an exchange of gunfire. The soul hunter says, "Why do you fight for her? Don’t you understand? She is "Satai".... I've seen her soul: they’re using you." Sinclair is thrown to the ground. The soul hunter's soul-capturing machine, trained upon on Delenn, activates. Sinclair gets up and turns the soul-draining machine away from Delenn and trains the beam onto the soul hunter. The soul hunter cries out, "No!", as he falls to the ground, his soul being captured by the machine and transferred into a spherical soul vessel.

As Delenn recovers in the MedLab, Sinclair in his quarters does a search for the Minbari word "Satai". Later, Sinclair escorts the second soul hunter off the station, telling him that the soul hunters are not welcome aboard the station. The soul hunter enquires what became of his brother's collection of soul vessels.

Delenn sits cross-legged in her quarters, with the soul hunter's soul vessels, setting the souls free one by one.

Writing
As Babylon 5 was conceived with an overall five-year story arc, the episode was written as both an individual story and with another level, where the hints of the larger story arc were given, such as Delenn's secrecy about her role on the Grey Council. The series' creator, J. Michael Straczynski indicates that the episodes can be watched for the individual stories, the character stories, or the story arc.

Regarding the dilemma posed by the opposing views on the afterlife of the soul hunter and Delenn, Straczynski writes, "If there is no afterlife, then all our experiences, all that we were, dies when we die. In that case, wouldn't it be significantly greater if we could preserve that knowledge somehow, in order to gain from their experiences[...]? Conversely, if there is an afterlife, a selfish desire to keep an important person's essence in order to educate the survivors would be catastrophic for the deceased individual - not to mention messing with the natural order." This also enabled motion effects which are difficult to create using models, such as the rotation of fighter craft along multiple axes, as seen when Sinclair's fighter matches the rotation of the soul hunter's spinning ship in order to grapple it; or the rotation and banking of a virtual camera. The visual effects were created by Foundation Imaging using 24 Commodore Amiga 2000 computers with Lightwave 3D and Video Toaster software, 16 of which were dedicated to rending each individual frame of CGI, with each frame taking on average 45 minutes to render. In-house resource management software managed the workload of the Amiga computers to ensure that no machine was left idle during the image rendering process.

The Starfury fighter was designed by Steve Burg as a function-driven design for a plausible zero-gravity fighter. The positioning of the four engine pods at the extremities of the craft was inspired by Ron Cobb's design for the Gunstar fighter from The Last Starfighter. The basic shape of the Starfury's wings was inspired by an earlier unused design by Burg for a military robot fighting machine, which he had originally designed for Terminator 2. This was merged with the multi-engined configuration to form the Starfury design. Burg points out that the wings/struts were not aerodynamic: they were there to lever the engines away from the center of mass. 

Despite having a similar wing configuration to the Star Wars X-Wing fighter, this was purely coincidental. Burg recollected, "Ron Thornton was the only person aware of the visual connection with the Terminator 2 walking machine. For obvious reasons, at the time I had compelling cause to keep the images under wraps. ...[T]he X-Wing is a very long needle shaped craft from most angles, whereas the Starfury is a very blunt shape. The X-Wing is also very much configured like a WWII fighter. Ideal for the Star Wars universe but not what we were going for on Babylon 5.'

The soul hunter ships were designed by Foundation Imaging co-founder Ron Thornton. He indicated, "I  get away with making the [virtual digital model's textures] out of wood, and bone. As if it used the tusks of some unknown huge beast for parts."

The scene where Sinclair's Starfury fighter grapples the spinning soul hunter ship attempts to show the fighter using thrusters to manoeuvre using realistic physics. Thornton stated that the producers "initially wanted Star Wars, there was also a lot of, '[let's] do something that Star Trek can't!' I said we could make realistic physics  exciting, and make the fans happy. ...[Visual effects supervisor Paul Bryant] and I pushed really hard for realistic physics as we both loved 2001..." 

Writer J. Michael Straczynski's original intention was that Sinclair's ship was to use magnetic energy to capture the soul hunter's ship. However, Thornton suggested using a grappling arm instead, stating, "I wanted to try something more interesting that hadn't been seen before. It was also a good opportunity to help me solidify to Joe and John how we could make the real physics exciting and make the pilots of the Starfuries seem like Top Guns. But not like Star Wars, as we could have our own distinctive and very different look."  The scene was animated by Foundation Imaging artists Tim Wilcox and Mark Kochinski.

Music for the title sequence and the episode was provided by the series' composer, Christopher Franke.

Reviews
Rowan Kaiser, writing in The A.V. Club, draws the parallel between the previous episode, being an exposition for Londo and G'Kar, and this episode, as an exposition for Sinclair and Delenn. Kaiser is intrigued by the philosophical opposition of the views of the soul hunter, who feels he is preserving souls, and those of Delenn, who feels he is keeping souls from their eternal destiny. Kaiser writes, "Soul Hunter" may be an average episode, saddled by a bit too much ambition and a few too many flaws, but that's why, as a critic, I find myself drawn to it. It's trying to say and do big things, and the effort is worth examining."

Elias Rosner, writing in Multiversity Comics, writes, "As a second episode, you could do with much worse than 'Soul Hunter.' It's got a creepy antagonist, a personal motivation/connection for one of the characters, ...to said antagonist, and keeps its focus on the central plotline for the entire episode."<ref name="Rosner">{{cite web |url=http://www.multiversitycomics.com/tv/babylon-5-soul-hunter  |title=Five Thoughts on Babylon 5'''s 'Soul Hunter.' |last=Rosner |first=Elias |date=30 May 2018 |website=Multiversity Comics |publisher=Matthew Meylikhov |access-date= |quote= |url-status= |archive-url= |archive-date= }}</ref> However, Rosner feels that the exaggerated dramatics are a weakness which may outweigh the episode’s strengths.

Rosner notes that the unanswered questions raised in the episode – concerning the Grey Council, Delenn's membership of it, the secrecy surrounding this, and how they are using Sinclair – give us reason to watch Delenn closely in subsequent episodes to try to discover what her game is. He concludes, "[T]his episode, despite all its flaws, shows what can be done when in the right hands.

References

External links

 Steve Burg's concept art for the Starfury fighter, along with Burg's unused concept art of the walking machine designed for Terminator 2''.
 Original storyboard graphics by Anthony Zierhut for the scene where Commander Sinclair's Starfury grapples the disabled soul hunter ship.

Babylon 5 episodes
1994 American television episodes